Gerard de Daumar de la Garde was a French Dominican from Limoges. In 1342 he was elected Master General of the Dominican order, but in the same year, on 20 September, was created Cardinal with the title of Santa Sabina and resigned. He died in Avignon on 28 September 1343.

References 

French Dominicans
1343 deaths
Year of birth unknown
Masters of the Order of Preachers